Timothy Peter Mo (born 30December 1950) is a British Asian novelist. Born to a British mother and a Hong Kong father, Mo lived in Hong Kong until the age of 10, when he moved to Britain. Educated at Mill Hill School and St John's College, Oxford, Mo worked as a journalist before becoming a novelist.

His works have won the Geoffrey Faber Memorial Prize, the Hawthornden Prize, and the James Tait Black Memorial Prize (for fiction), and three of his novels were shortlisted for the Booker Prize for Fiction. Mo was also the recipient of the 1992 E. M. Forster Award. His novel An Insular Possession (1986) was among the contenders in The Telegraph's list of the 10 all-time greatest Asian novels. 

In the early 1990s Mo became increasingly mistrustful of his publishers and increasingly outspoken about the publishing industry in general. Since 1994 when he rejected a £125,000 advance from Random House for his next novel, he has self-published his books under the label "Paddleless Press". His first novel to be self-published was Brownout on Breadfruit Boulevard.

Background 
Mo has been described as a British Asian author.

Novels 

The Monkey King (1978)
Sour Sweet (1982), filmed as Soursweet in 1988
An Insular Possession (1986)
The Redundancy of Courage (1991)
Brownout on Breadfruit Boulevard (1995)
Renegade or Halo2 (2000)
Pure (2012)

Awards
 1979: Geoffrey Faber Memorial Prize for The Monkey King
 1982: Booker Prize for Fiction (shortlist) for Sour Sweet
 1982: Hawthornden Prize for Sour Sweet
 1986: Booker Prize for Fiction (shortlist) for An Insular Possession
 1991: Booker Prize for Fiction (shortlist) for The Redundancy of Courage
 1992: E. M. Forster Award
 1999: James Tait Black Memorial Prize (for fiction) for Renegade or Halo2

References

External links
 

1950 births
Living people
20th-century British male writers
20th-century British novelists
21st-century British male writers
21st-century British novelists
Alumni of St John's College, Oxford
British male novelists
British people of Hong Kong descent
English people of Hong Kong descent
James Tait Black Memorial Prize recipients
People educated at Mill Hill School